Karen Castrejón Trujillo (born 1 April 1980) is a Mexican lawyer and politician, currently serving as President of the Ecologist Green Party of Mexico since November 2020. She has also served as Secretary of Environment and Natural Resources under the administration of Héctor Astudillo Flores and local deputy to the Congress of Guerrero from 2012 to 2015 for the Green Ecologist Party of Mexico.

She studied law at the Autonomous University of Guerrero, from which she graduated in 2003, and later obtained a diploma in Environmental Law and Management from the Faculty of Sciences of the National Autonomous University of Mexico.

References 

Living people
1980 births
Ecologist Green Party of Mexico politicians
21st-century Mexican politicians
21st-century Mexican women politicians

Presidents of the Green Ecologist Party of Mexico
People from Acapulco
Autonomous University of Guerrero alumni
Members of the Congress of Guerrero
Deputies of the LXV Legislature of Mexico
Women members of the Chamber of Deputies (Mexico)